Cutlerville is an unincorporated community and census-designated place (CDP) in Kent County in the U.S. state of Michigan.  The population was 17,849 as of the 2020 census.  The community is located mostly within Byron Township to the west with a smaller portion within Gaines Township to the east. 

History
John Cutler, who came here from New York state with his wife and ten children, bought  in 1853 and built a log cabin. In 1891, his son John I. Cutler built the Cutler mansion, which in 1910 became the nucleus of the Pine Rest Christian Mental Health Services.

Geography

The Buck Creek flows through the community, which flows north to the Grand River in the city of Grandville.

Cutlerville is in southwestern Kent County within Byron Township on the west and Gaines Township on the east. The community is bordered to the north by the cities of Wyoming and Kentwood.

Major highways
  runs south–north through the center of the community.
  runs west–east through the northern portion of the community and has an interchange with U.S. Route 131.

Demographics

As of the census of 2000, there were 15,114 people, 5,975 households, and 3,907 families residing in the community. The racial makeup of the community was 88.93% White, 4.61% African American, 0.58% Native American, 1.64% Asian, 0.02% Pacific Islander, 1.96% from other races, and 2.26% from two or more races. Hispanic or Latino of any race were 4.49% of the population.

There were 5,975 households, out of which 33.2% had children under the age of 18 living with them, 47.8% were married couples living together, 13.4% had a female homeowner with no husband present, and 34.6% were non-families. 25.6% of all households were made up of single persons, and 6.0% had someone living alone who was 65 years of age or older.  The average household size was 2.49 and the average family size was 2.99.

In the community, the population was spread out, with 27.4% under the age of 18, 10.6% from 18 to 24, 32.7% from 25 to 44, 18.9% from 45 to 64, and 10.5% who were 65 years of age or older.  The median age was 32 years. For every 100 females, there were 97.8 males.  For every 100 females age 18 and over, there were 94.4 males.

The median income for a household in the community was $40,809, and the median income for a family was $43,972. Males had a median income of $36,085 versus $24,989 for females. The per capita income for the community was $19,648.  About 4.4% of families and 7.2% of the population were below the poverty line, including 9.3% of those under age 18 and 5.2% of those age 65 or over.

Notable people
 Brian Diemer, bronze medalist in the 3000 meter steeplechase at the 1984 Summer Olympics
 Carlee Hoffman, Paralympic Games gold medalist

References

Unincorporated communities in Michigan
Unincorporated communities in Kent County, Michigan
Census-designated places in Michigan
Census-designated places in Kent County, Michigan
Grand Rapids metropolitan area
Populated places established in 1853
1853 establishments in Michigan